John Langwith Jr. (c.1753-1825) was an architect and  builder who worked in Grantham. He was the son of  John Langwith, Senior (c.1723-1795) and the architectural practice was continued in Grantham  by his son  Joseph Silvester Langwith (1787-1854). John Langwith junior  was declared bankrupt in February  1795  but paid the debt off in dividends and was discharged. By 1820, he is described as Gentleman and served as Mayor and Alderman of Grantham.

Work by John Langwith

Grantham Vicarage, Church Street. 1789, which he rebuilt.
Barkston Rectory, Lincolnshire. 1801.  
In 181 he prepared plans for a Prison at Grantham, but it is not clear if it was built.
Lincoln Race Stand c.1818. Langwith was the architect and contractor for the Race Stand  This was replaced by the existing Race Stand of 1897 by William Mortimer

Literature
Antram N (revised), Pevsner N & Harris J, (1989), The Buildings of England: Lincolnshire, Yale University Press. 
Colvin H. A (1995), Biographical Dictionary of British Architects 1600-1840. Yale University Press, 3rd edition London, pg.599.
Worsley G.(1987). Georgian Buildings in Grantham , Country Life, 4th. June.

References

1795 deaths
19th-century English architects
Architects from Lincolnshire
Year of birth uncertain